Tomb TT187, located in the necropolis of El-Khokha in Thebes, Egypt, is the tomb of a wab-priest of Amun named Pakhihet.

Pakhihet was the son of Ashaket (TT174), who was a priest in front of Mut, and Tadjabu. His wife's name was Mutemonet. The scenes in the tomb show Pakhihet and two sons on a lintel in the hall, and elsewhere with his wife Mutemonet and a daughter.

See also
 List of Theban tombs

References

Buildings and structures completed in the 13th century BC
Nineteenth Dynasty of Egypt
Theban tombs